Nemanja Latinović (Serbian Cyrillic: Немања Латиновић; born February 21, 1994) is a Serbian football goalkeeper.

References

External links
 
 
 Nemanja Latinović stats at Utakmica.rs

Association football goalkeepers
Serbian footballers
Serbia youth international footballers
FK Hajduk Kula players
FK Bačka 1901 players
FK Novi Pazar players
OFK Bačka players
FK Mladost Lučani players
FK Temnić players
Serbian SuperLiga players
Serbian expatriate footballers
Serbian expatriate sportspeople in Romania
Expatriate footballers in Romania
1994 births
Living people
People from Vrbas, Serbia